van Thienen or Vanthienen is a surname. Notable people with the surname include:

Jacob van Thienen (died 1410), Flemish architect
Jan Vanthienen (born 1956), Belgian business theorist and computer scientist

See also
Van Thielen

Surnames of Dutch origin